Rudolph Ruzicka (29 June 1883 – 20 July 1978) was a Czech American wood engraver, etcher, illustrator, typeface designer, and book designer. Ruzicka designed typefaces and wood engraving illustrations for Daniel Berkeley Updike's Merrymount Press, and was a designer for, and consultant to, the Mergenthaler Linotype Company for fifty years. He designed a number of seals and medals, including the American Institute of Graphic Arts (AIGA) and the Dartmouth Medal of the American Library Association.

Biography
Rudolph Ruzicka was born in Bohemia in 1883. He emigrated to the United States of America at age ten, living first in Chicago where he took drawing lessons at the Hull House School before becoming an apprentice wood engraver. From 1900 to 1902 he attended further classes at the Art Institute of Chicago. In 1903 he moved to New York to work as an engraver at the American Bank Note Company and at Calkins & Holden. In subsequent years he attended classes at both the Art Students League of New York and the New York School of Art.

In 1910 Ruzicka set up his own shop at 954 Lexington Avenue in New York City. He received his first major art commission from System magazine. Many exhibitions followed, including such venues as the Societe de la Gravure, Paris, the Grolier Club, and the Century Association, New York. In 1916 Ruzicka built a house and a workshop in Dobbs Ferry, New York.

In 1935 Ruzicka was awarded the Gold Medal from the American Institute of Graphic Arts, and in that same year began work with the Typographic Development staff at Mergenthaler Linotype Company, for which he was to produce typeface families.

In 1948 he moved to Massachusetts, and eventually he settled in Vermont.

Over the years, D. B. Updike and Ruzicka collaborated on a number of well-respected book designs, including Newark and the Grolier Club's Irving, as well as a fine series of Merrymount Press annual keepsakes. Ruzicka also provided substantial consulting for Updike's book Printing Types. Today Ruzicka's art is collected in the Art Institute of Chicago, the Carnegie Institute, Library of Congress, the Brooklyn Institute of Arts and Sciences, and the Metropolitan Museum of Art, New York.

Typefaces
 Lake Informal, designed for Linotype in 1935, though matrices were evidently never cut, as there is no record of this type having ever actually been cast in metal.  Design later used for so-called "digital type" in 1993.
 Ruzicka Freehand, proposed designs made for Linotype in 1939 and never made into actual type.  A digital knock-off of this design was made in 1993 by Ann Chaisson and Mark Altman. 
 Fairfield series
 Fairfield + Italic (Mergenthaler Linotype Company, 1940).  Perhaps twenty digital variants of this face have been designed by Alex Kaczun for Linotype.
 Fairfield Medium + Italic (Mergenthaler Linotype Company, 1949).  A digital knock-off of this has been issued by Bitstream as Transitional 751.
 Primer + Italic (Mergenthaler Linotype Company, 1953), designed for legibility and to compete with A.T.F.'s  Century Schoolbook.  A digital knock-off of this has been issued by Bitstream as Century 751.

See also
 List of AIGA medalists

External links 
The Papers of Rudolph Ruzicka in the Dartmouth College Library
Biography of Rudolph Ruzicka

References 

 Edward Connery Lathem, Rudolph Ruzicka: Speaking Reminiscently. New York: Grolier Club, 1986. (Memoirs)
 Edward Connery Lathem and Elizabeth French Lathem (eds), D.B.U. and R.R.: Selected Extracts from Correspondence between Daniel Berkeley Updike and Rudolph Ruzicka, 1908 to 1941. New York: American Printing History Association, 1997.

1883 births
1978 deaths
AIGA medalists
American printmakers
American illustrators
American typographers and type designers
Austro-Hungarian emigrants to the United States
People from the Kingdom of Bohemia
School of the Art Institute of Chicago alumni
American wood engravers